The Mangalarga is a horse breed that was originally developed in Brazil by Francisco Gabriel Junqueira, the Baron of Alfenas, when he began breeding Alter Real stallions from Portugal with local Colonial Spanish mares on his lands in Baependi County at Minas Gerais State.

Thus work of Junqueira also developed the Mangalarga Marchador breed that differs from the Mangalarga due to the influence of different bloodlines and a focus on different traits. However, at the beginning, there was just one type of horse, the "Mangalarga Horse". However, today the two breeds are different from one another and each has its own studbook and breed associations.

References 

Horse breeds
Horse breeds originating in Brazil